Acqua Paradiso Monza Brianza is a professional volleyball team of Pallavolo Gabeca (till 2009 Acqua Paradiso Gabeca Montichiari), based in Monza, Italy. It plays in Italian Volleyball League. It was born in Carpenedolo in 1975.
In the next season (2011–12) will play the CEV Cup.

Achievements
CEV Cup Winners' Cup: 2

Team 2011/12
 Tsimafei Zhukouski
  Luciano De Cecco
  Facundo Conte
  Simone Buti
  Konstantin Shumov
  Marcello Forni
  Carlo Mor
  Miloš Nikić
  Sean Rooney
  Marco Molteni
  Mauro Gavotto
  Nicolas Roumeliotis
  Salvatore Rossini
  Edoardo Ciabattini
  Tamas Kaszap

Notable former players
 Lorenzo Bernardi
 Marcello Forni
 Ferdinando De Giorgi
 Marco Meoni
 Marco Molteni
 Francesco Dall'Olio
 Alessandro Paparoni
 Michele Pasinato
 Damiano Pippi
 Andrea Sartoretti
 Cristian Savani
 Luciano De Cecco
 Facundo Conte
 Mauricio Lima
 Marcelo Negrão
 Plamen Kostantinov
 Ventceslav Simeonov 
 Osvaldo Hernández
 Rafael Pascual
 Mikko Esko
 Konstantin Shumov
 Stefan Hubner
 Jimmy George
 Guido Görtzen
 Robert Horstink
 Reinder Nummerdor
 Jan Posthuma
 Ronald Zoodsma
 Evgueni Mitkov
 Semyon Poltavskiy
 Dejan Bojović
 Andrija Gerić
 Nikola Grbić
 Miloš Nikić
 Sean Rooney
 Ryan Millar

References

Italian volleyball clubs
Sport in Monza